Roy Moore (22 December 1914 – 4 June 1973) was an Australian rules footballer who played with South Melbourne in the Victorian Football League (VFL) during the 1930s. His father Herbert Moore played a game for South Melbourne in their premiership year of 1909.

Moore, a forward who liked the torpedo punt, came to South Melbourne from the Sandhurst Football Club in Bendigo. He kicked 52 goals in his debut VFL season. Two of those came in South Melbourne's losing 1935 VFL Grand Final team, where he replaced the injured Bob Pratt at full-forward, and he also kicked two goals in another losing Grand Final the following season.

Late in the 1937 season, against Fitzroy at Lake Oval, Moore bagged a career-best nine goals despite the entire South Melbourne team managing just ten in the entire game; as of 2022, this remains a joint league record for the highest percentage of a team's goals in a single match (with a minimum qualifying total of least 8 goals); only Collingwood's Dick Lee has kicked that many goals in a game where only one other kicked a major score, sharing the record. A leg injury restricted his appearances towards the end of his career, but Moore managed to finish as his club's top goal-kicker in 1938 with 34 goals. He represented the VFL on one occasion, in a game against the VFA.

References

Holmesby, Russell and Main, Jim (2007). The Encyclopedia of AFL Footballers. 7th ed. Melbourne: Bas Publishing.

External links

1914 births
1973 deaths
Australian rules footballers from Victoria (Australia)
Sydney Swans players
Sandhurst Football Club players